The first-generation Ford Mustang was manufactured by Ford from March 1964 until 1973. The introduction of the Mustang created a new class of automobiles known as the pony cars. The Mustang’s styling, with its long hood and short deck, proved wildly popular and inspired a host of competition.

It was initially introduced on April 17, 1964, as a hardtop and convertible with the fastback version put on sale in August 1964. At the time of its introduction, the Mustang, sharing its platform with the Falcon, was slotted into a compact car segment.

With each revision, the Mustang saw an increase in overall dimensions and in engine power. The 1971 model saw a drastic redesign to its predecessors. After an initial surge, sales were steadily declining, as Ford began working on a new generation Mustang. With the onset of the 1973 oil crisis, Ford was prepared, having already designed the smaller Mustang II for the 1974 model year. This new car had no common components with preceding models.

Conception and styling 
As Lee Iacocca's assistant general manager and chief engineer, Donald N. Frey was the head engineer for the Mustang project — supervising the development of the Mustang in a record 18 months from September 1962 to April 1964. — while Iacocca himself championed the project as Ford Division general manager.

Drawing on inspiration from the mid-engined Ford Mustang I concept vehicle, Lee Iacocca ordered development of a new "small car" to vice-president of design at Ford, Eugene Bordinat.

Bordinat tasked Ford's three design studios (Ford, Lincoln-Mercury, and Advanced Design) to create proposals for the new vehicle.

Design
The Ford design studio ultimately produced the winning design in the intramural contest, under Project Design Chief Joe Oros and his team of L. David Ash, Gale Halderman, John Foster and George Schumaker. This design was called the Cougar by the design team.

Oros states:

In a 2004 interview, Oros recalls the planning behind the design:

David Ash
L. David Ash is often credited with the actual styling of the Mustang. Ash, in a 1985 interview speaking of the origin of the Mustang design, when asked the degree of his contribution, said:

Gale Halderman
Gale Halderman, in a 2002 interview with Collectible Automobile, spoke of the Mustang's evolution through the Ford design studio:

To decrease developmental costs, the Mustang used chassis, suspension, and drivetrain components derived from the Ford Falcon and Fairlane. It used a unitized platform-type frame from the 1964 Falcon and welded box-section side rails, including welded crossmembers. Although hardtop Mustangs accounted for the highest sales, durability problems with the new frame led to the engineering of a convertible first, which ensured adequate stiffness. The overall length of the Mustang and Falcon was identical, although the Mustang's wheelbase was slightly shorter. Although most of the mechanical parts were from the Falcon, the Mustang's body was completely different; sporting a shorter wheelbase, wider track, lower seating position, and lower overall height. An industry first, the "torque box" was an innovative structural system that greatly stiffened the Mustang's construction and helped contribute to better handling.

Gale Haldeman spoke of the engineering and design of the car in his interview, stating:

The idea for a fastback originated with Joe Oros as well, and was designed in Charlie Phaneuf's studio. Haldeman recalls:

An additional 4-door model was designed by Dave Ash as a clay model, but was not considered.

1964½–1966 

Since it was introduced four months before the normal start of the 1965 production year and manufactured alongside 1964 Ford Falcons and 1964 Mercury Comets, the earliest Mustangs are widely referred to as the 1964½ model by enthusiasts. Nevertheless, all "1964½" cars were given 1965 U.S. standard VINs at the time of production, and – with limited exception to the earliest of promotional materials – were marketed by Ford as 1965 models. Standard equipment for the early 1965 Mustangs included black front seat belts, a glove box light, and a padded dash board. Production began in March 1964 and Mustang Serial Number One (5F08F100001) was sold on April 14, 1964, at the George Parsons Ford dealership in St. John’s, Newfoundland, Canada. Official introduction followed on April 17 at the 1964 World's Fair. The V8 models were identified with a badge on the front fender that spelled out the engine's cubic inch displacement ("260" or "289") over a wide "V." This emblem was identical to the one on the 1964 Fairlane.

Several changes to the Mustang occurred at the start of the "normal" 1965 model year in August 1964, about four months after its introduction. These cars are known as "late 65's". The engine lineup was changed, with a  "T-code" engine that produced . Production of the Fairlane's "F-code"  engine ceased when the 1964 model year ended. It was replaced with a new  "C-code"  engine with a two-barrel carburetor as the base V8. The DC electrical generator was replaced by a new AC alternator on all Fords (a way to distinguish a 1964 from a 1965 is to see if the alternator light on the dash says "GEN" or "ALT").

GT Equipment Group 
The Mustang GT version was introduced as the "GT Equipment Package" and included a V8 engine (most often the  "289"), grille-mounted fog lamps, rocker-panel stripes, and disc brakes. In the interior, the GT option added a different instrument panel that included a speedometer, fuel gauge, temp. gauge, oil pressure gauge and amp meter in five round dials (the gauges were not marked with numbers, however.) A four-barrel carbureted engine was now available with any body style. Additionally, reverse lights were an option added to the car from August 1964 production. The Mustang was originally available as either a hardtop or convertible, but during the car's early design phases a fastback model was strongly considered. For 1965, the Shelby Mustang was born, available only in a newly introduced fastback body version with its swept-back rear glass and distinctive ventilation louvers. In 1965 they built 15,079 Mustangs that featured the GT Equipment Group. For 1966, they built 25,517 GTs. According to Jim Smart production guide, the fastback would have been the most common, followed by the coupe and then the convertible.

Options 
The standard interior features of the 1965 Mustang included adjustable driver and passenger bucket seats, an AM radio, and a floor-mounted shifter in a variety of color options. Ford added additional interior options during the 1965 model year. The Interior Decor Group was popularly known as "Pony Interior" due to the addition of embossed running ponies on the seat fronts, and also included integral armrests, woodgrain appliqué accents, and a round gauge cluster that would replace the standard Falcon instrumentation. Also available were sun visors, a (mechanical) remote-operated mirror, a floor console, and a bench seat. Ford later offered an under-dash air-conditioning unit and discontinued the vinyl with cloth insert seat option, offered only in early 1965 models. One option designed strictly for fun was the Rally-Pac. Introduced in 1963 after Ford's success at that year's Monte Carlo Rally and available on other Ford and Mercury compacts and intermediates, the Rally-Pac was a combination clock and tachometer mounted to the steering column. It was available as a factory-ordered option for $69.30. Installed by a dealer, the Rally-Pac was priced at $75.95. A 14-inch wheel option was available for Rally-Pac and GT350R vehicles widening front and rear track to 57.5 inches. A compass, rear seat belts, A/C, and back-up lights were also optional.

Nationwide survey of owners by Popular Mechanics included many complaints about leg room. Fuel economy for the base V8 was good for the period, with a test by Popular Mechanics rating the optional 260 cubic inch engine with automatic transmission achieving  at a steady .

The 1966 Mustang debuted with moderate trim changes including a new grille, side ornamentation, wheel covers, and gas cap. Ford's new C4 "Cruise-O-Matic" three-speed automatic transmission became available for the 225 hp V8. The 289 "HiPo" K-code engine was also offered with C4 transmission, but it had stronger internals and can be identified by the outer casing of the servo which is marked with a 'C'. The long duration solid-lifter camshaft that allowed the high revving 289 to make the horsepower it was known for, was not friendly for a low stall speed automatic torque converter. The "HiPo" could be spotted by the  vibration damper, (compared to 1/2 inch on the 225-hp version) and the absence of a vacuum advance unit on the dual point distributor. With the valve covers off, there is a large letter "K" stamped between the valve springs, along with screw-in studs (vs. a pressed-in stud for other 289s) for the adjustable rocker arms. A large number of new paint and interior color options, an AM/eight-track sound system, and one of the first AM/FM mono automobile radios were also offered. It also removed the Falcon instrument cluster; the previously optional features, including the round gauges and padded sun visors, became standard equipment. The Mustang would be the best-selling convertible in 1966, with 72,119 sold, beating the number two Impala by almost 2:1.

The 1965 and 1966 Mustangs are differentiated by variations in the exterior, despite the similar design. These variations include the emblem on the quarter-panels behind the doors. From August 1964 production, the emblem was a single vertical piece of chrome, while for 1966 models the emblem was smaller in height and had three horizontal bars extending from the design, resembling an "E". The front intake grilles and ornaments were also different. The 1965 front grille used a "honeycomb" pattern, while the 1966 version was a "slotted" style. While both model years used the "Horse and Corral" emblem on the grille, the 1965s had four bars extending from each side of the corral, while these bars were removed for the 1966s. The 1966 model year saw introduction of 'High Country Special' limited edition, 333 of them were sold in Colorado, Wyoming, and Nebraska.

When Ford wanted to introduce the Mustang in Germany, they discovered that the Krupp company had already registered the name for a truck. The German company offered to sell the rights for US$10,000. Ford refused and removed Mustang badges from exported units, instead, they named the cars T-5 (a pre-production Mustang project name) for the German market until 1979 when Krupp copyrights expired.

1965 Mustang AWD prototype
In 1965, Harry Ferguson Research purchased three Mustang hardtops and converted them to 4x4 in an attempt to sell potential clients on their FF AWD system. A similar system was used in the Ferguson P99 Formula One race car, and would go on to be featured in the Jensen FF that is considered the first AWD non all-terrain passenger car. As in the Jensen FF, the AWD Mustangs also featured anti-lock braking that would later be known as ABS. The Dunlop Maxaret system was modified from its original use on airplanes.

1966 Right-Hand-Drive Mustang
Ford Australia organized the importation and conversion of 1966 model year Mustangs to right-hand-drive (RHD) for the Australian market. This coincided with the launch of the new XR Falcon for 1966, which was marketed as the "Mustang-bred Falcon". To set the official conversion apart from the cottage industry, the RHD Mustangs were called the "Ford Australia Delivered Mustang" and had compliance plates similar to the XR Falcon. About 209 were imported by Ford Australia – 48 units were imported and converted in 1965 and the further 161 were done in 1966.

Engines

1967–1968 

The 1967 model year Mustang was the first significant redesign of the original model. Ford's designers began drawing up a larger version even as the original was achieving sales success, and while "Iacocca later complained about the Mustang's growth, he did oversee the redesign for 1967." The major mechanical feature was to allow the installation of a big-block V8 engine. The overall size, interior and cargo space were increased. Exterior trim changes included concave taillights, side scoop (1967 model) and chrome (1968 model) side ornamentation, square rear-view mirrors, and usual yearly wheel and gas cap changes. The high-performance 289 option was placed behind the newer   FE engine from the Ford Thunderbird, which was equipped with a four-barrel carburetor. During the mid-1968 model year, a drag racer for the street could be ordered with the optional  Cobra Jet engine which was officially rated at  all of these Mustangs were issued R codes on their VINs.

The 1967 Deluxe Interior was revised, discontinuing the embossed running horse motif on the seatbacks (the source for the "pony interior" nickname) in favor of a new deluxe interior package, which included special color options, brushed aluminum (from August 1966 production) or woodgrain dash trim, seat buttons, and special door panels. The hardtop also included upholstered quarter trim panels, a carryover from the 1965–1966 deluxe interior. The 1967 hardtop also had the chrome quarter trim caps, carried over from 1965–1966, but these were painted to match the interior in 1968 models. The 1967 deluxe interior included stainless steel-trimmed seat back shells, similar to those in the Thunderbird. These were dropped at the end of the 1967 model year and were not included in the woodgrain-trimmed 1968 interior. The deluxe steering wheel, which had been included in the deluxe interior for 1965 and 1966, became optional, and could also be ordered with the standard interior. The 1968 models that were produced from January 1968 were also the first model year to incorporate three-point lap and shoulder belts (which had previously been optional, in 1967–1968 models) as opposed to the standard lap belts. The air-conditioning option was fully integrated into the dash, the speakers and stereo were upgraded, and unique center and overhead consoles were options. The fastback model offered the option of a rear fold-down seat, and the convertible was available with folding glass windows. Gone was the Rally-Pac, since the new instrument cluster had provisions for an optional tachometer and clock. Its size and shape also precluded the installation of the accessory atop the steering column. The convenience group with four warning lights for low fuel, seat belt reminder, parking brake not released, and door ajar were added to the instrument panel, or, if one ordered the optional console and A/C, the lights were mounted on the console.

Changes for the 1968 model increased safety with a two-spoke energy-absorbing steering wheel, along with newly introduced shoulder belts. Other changes included front and rear side markers, "FORD" lettering removed from the hood, rearview mirror moved from frame to windshield, a  V8 engine was now available, and C-Stripe graphics were added.

The California Special Mustang, or GT/CS, was visually based on the Shelby model and was only sold in Western states. Its sister, the 'High Country Special', was sold in Denver, Colorado. While the GT/CS was only available as a coupe, the 'High Country Special' model was available in fastback and convertible configurations during the 1966 and 1967 model years, and as a coupe for 1968.

The 1968 Ford Mustang GT Fastback got a popularity boost after it was featured in the 1968 film Bullitt, starring Steve McQueen. In the film, McQueen drove a modified 1968 Mustang GT 2+2 Fastback chasing a Dodge Charger through the streets of San Francisco.

On January 10, 2020, the car that was driven by McQueen, later owned by Robert Kiernan, and subsequently by his son Sean, was sold at Mecum Auctions for a record price of $3.7 million, including auction fees.

Engines

1969–1970 

The corralled grille pony was replaced with the pony and tribars logo, set off-center to the driver's side. The car was longer than previous models and sported convex rather than concave side panels. The fastback body version was named SportsRoof in Ford's literature.

The 1969 model year saw the introduction of the Mach 1, with a variety of powerplants options and many new styling and performance features. Distinctive reflective striping was placed along the body sides, with a pop-open gas cap, dual exhausts, matte-black hood with simulated air scoop and NASCAR-style cable and pin tiedowns. It used steel wheels with white lettered Goodyear Polyglas tires. A functional "shaker" hood scoop – which visibly vibrated by being attached directly to the air cleaner through a hole in the hood – was available, as were tail-mounted wing and chin spoilers and rear window louvered blackout shade. The Mach 1 featured a deluxe interior with simulated wood trim, high-backed seats, extra sound deadening, remote sports mirrors, and other features. The Mach 1 proved popular with buyers as 72,458 cars were sold through 1969.

The Boss 302 was created to meet Trans Am rules and featured distinctive hockey-stick stripes, while the understated Boss 429 was created to homologate the Boss 429 engine (based on the new Ford 385 series engine) for NASCAR use. The two Boss models received fame on the track and street. A total of 1,628 Boss 302's and 859 Boss 429's were sold through 1969 – making these vehicles somewhat rare.

A new "luxury" model became available starting for 1969, available in only the hardtop body style. The 'Grande' featured a soft ride,  of extra sound deadening, as well as a deluxe interior with simulated wood trim. It was popular with buyers with 22,182 units sold through 1969.

Amidst other special editions, the 1969 Mustang E was offered for those desiring high mpg. The 1969 Limited Edition Mustang E was a rare (about 50 produced) fastback special model designed for economy. It came with a six-cylinder engine, a high stall torque converter for the standard automatic transmission, and a low, 2.33:1 rear axle ratio. Mustang E lettering on the rear quarters identified the special Mustang E. Air conditioning was not available on the 'E' model.

The Mustang GT was discontinued in 1969 due to poor sales versus the success of the new Mach 1 with only 5396 GT models sold that year.

A new  Thriftpower I6 engine with  filled the gap between the existing  Thriftpower I6 and the V8 engine line-up.

If an V or W axle was ordered (3.90 or 4.30 locking ratio) on any Cobra Jet Mustang, included were engine improvements to make it more reliable on the strip. Included was an engine oil cooler (making AC not available as an option), stronger crankshaft and conrods, improved engine balancing, and was named the 'Super Cobra Jet'. These improvements were later referred to as 'Drag Pack'.

The 1969 Shelby Mustang was now under Ford's control and made to look vastly different from regular production Mustangs, despite now being built inhouse by Ford. Two models were available, GT-350 (with a 351 cu in (5.8 L) Windsor (351W) producing ) and GT-500 (with the 428 cu in (7.0 L) Cobra Jet engine), in both sportsroof or convertible versions. All 1969–1970 Shelby Mustangs were produced in 1969. Because of dwindling sales, the 789 remaining 1969 cars were given new serial numbers and titled as 1970 models. They had modified front air dam and a blackout paint treatment around the hood scoops.

The 1970 model year Mustangs were restyled to be less aggressive and therefore returned to single headlamps which were moved to the inside of the grille opening with 'fins' on the outside of the grille sides. The styling of the 1969 model was deemed for a drop in sales and this prompted the headlamp revisions and simplification of other exterior styling aspects for 1970. In the end, however, the 1969 model year sales exceeded those of 1970. The rear fender air scoops were removed and the taillight panel was now flat instead of concave as seen on 1969 models. The interior options remained mostly unchanged.

1970 model year saw the previous 351W V8 engine options replaced with a new 351 cu in (5.8 L) Cleveland (351C) V8 in either 2V (2-venturi carburetor) or 4V (4-venturi carburetor) versions; however, some early production 1970 Mustangs had the 351W. The 351C 4V (M code) engine featured 11.0:1 compression and produced 300 bhp (224 kW; 304 PS) at 5400 rpm. This new performance engine incorporated elements learned from the Ford 385 series engine and the Boss 302, particularly the poly-angle combustion chambers with canted valves and the thin-wall casting technology.

Ford made 96 'Mustang Twister Special' cars for Ford's Kansas City District Sales Office in late 1969. The Twister Specials were Grabber Orange Mach 1s with special decals. Ford also made a few 'Sidewinders', which were built in Dearborn, shipped to Omaha, and sold in Iowa and Nebraska. They were available in Grabber Green, Grabber Blue, Calypso Coral, and Yellow. The stripes came in the trunk to be installed by dealers.

Engines

1971–1973

1971 
Introduced in September 1970, the 1971 Mustang was green-lighted by Ford's new president, Semon "Bunkie" Knudsen, formerly of General Motors. Again, the revised model grew in size, gaining 3 inches in width in order to accommodate Ford's big block  V8 without need for an extensive suspension redesign.

As before there were three body styles offered: Hardtop (available in base or Grande trim), SportsRoof (available in base or Mach 1 trim), and convertible (no specific trim packages available).

Hardtop 
The new 1971 hardtop featured a prominent "tunnelback" rear window design with flowing rear pillars, a completion of the styling exercise of the outgoing model. Hardtops with 'Grande' trim gained a vinyl roof and Grande badges on the C-pillars.

An additional edition, the Spring Special, was available between March and May 1971, which added Mach 1 styling cues (side stripes, tu-tone paint, urethane bumper, honeycomb grill with sportlamps) to the hardtop.

SportsRoof 
SportsRoof models were available in base configurations in addition to the Mach 1 and Boss 351 sport/performance options.

The Mach 1s were available with two-tone paint schemes, optional hockey-stick stripes, NACA (NASA) hood scoops (functional on 999 ordered with Ram Air), color-keyed side mirrors, and additional sports/performance options. All Mach 1 models came stock with urethane front bumpers and an alternate grille equipped with amber sportlights. Though the Mach 1 is often associated with the NACA hood (a no-cost option) and other styling cues, base Mach 1s could be had with the standard hood and the 302 2V engine.

Boss 351 models were similar in appearance to the Mach 1, and included a larger black-out hood than Mach 1's, front and rear spoilers, dual exhaust with no rear valance cutouts, and chrome bumpers paired with the sportlamp grille.

Convertible 
Convertibles were equipped with a power top and a glass rear window. The 1973 models were the last Mustangs available as a convertible until the 1983 model year. Convertibles featured no unique exterior visual package of their own during their first year of introduction.

1972 

Due to tightening emissions regulations, the Boss 351 edition and optional 429 big block were dropped after 1971, leaving the  variants as the largest available engines for 1972 (and 1973).

Exterior differences were virtually unchanged, though all 1972 models were revised with "Fasten Seat Belt" warning lamps on the right side dash panel. The "Decor Group" exterior trim package was also revised, allowing coupe and convertible owners to option their car with two-tone lower body paint, plus the honeycomb sportlamp grille from the Mach 1/Boss 351 and the Mach 1's urethane bumper.

A commemorative Olympic Sprint Edition (also available on the Pinto and Maverick) was released between March and June of this year. Sprint editions were available in Hardtop and Sportsroof variants, and featured white paint schemes with light blue accents and USA shield decals on the rear quarter panels. An additional 50 Sprint convertibles were produced exclusively for the 1972 National Cherry Blossom Parade in Washington D.C.

1972 saw the end of the special Ford muscle car performance engine era. At mid-year, Ford offered a slightly detuned Boss 351 engine, which could be ordered with any model. A total of 398 Mustangs were built with the drag race-oriented R code engine and were designated as the 351 HO. Mandatory options were the top loader 4-speed, competition N case rear end (427, 428, 429, Boss 351, 351HO), and air conditioning delete. Vacuum-operated Ram Air was not available. However, the HO came with the first full-time cold air induction system in a Mustang, routing cold air via a two-piece plastic duct under the battery tray to the air cleaner snorkel. All 351 HO cars were manufactured in Dearborn, MI.

1973 
1973 brought some mild restyling. The urethane front bumper became standard and was enlarged in accordance with new NHTSA standards. All Mustang models had their sportlamps replaced with vertical turn signals, as the new bumper covered the previous turn signal locations in the front valance. Both a Mach 1 and base grille were offered, with differing insert patterns.

Mach 1 decals were also revised in 1972 for 1973 models, and the previous hockey stick side stripes of 1971–1972 models became an option on hardtops and convertibles with the addition of the 'Exterior Decor Group'. Magnum 500 wheels, previously optional, were superseded by forged aluminum 5-hole wheels.

The 1973 model year Mustang was the final version of the original pony car, as the model name migrated to the economy, Ford Pinto-based Mustang II the next year.

Other variants 
A small number of Mexican-produced cars were manufactured with the 'GT-351' trim package, under license by Shelby de Mexico. Additionally, 14 Shelby Europa vehicles were modified and decaled by Belgian Shelby dealer Claude Dubois for European clientele.

Engines 
Automakers in the U.S. switched from gross to net power and torque ratings in 1972 (coinciding with the introduction of low-compression engines); thus, it is difficult to compare power and torque ratings between 1971 and 1972.

Production 
In 1964, Mustang sales started with 22,000 orders taken on the first day at the World's Fair and around the country. In the first two years of production, three Ford Motor Company plants in Milpitas, California; Dearborn, Michigan; and Metuchen, New Jersey produced almost 1.3 million Mustangs.

From 1965, the Mustang was also made at the La Villa plant in Mexico. Initially, only the hardtop with a V8 engine (initially the 289, the 351 was added in 1970). The Mach 1 fastback was added in 1973..

Industry reaction 
Even though Chrysler had introduced the Plymouth Barracuda a few weeks before the "clean sheet" Mustang, it rapidly overcame the slightly redesigned Plymouth Valiant to not only dominate the emerging car sector—the pony car—but literally define it. It left the Barracuda in its tracks, and caught GM flat-footed. Unprepared General Motors executives thought the rear-engined Chevrolet Corvair Monza would compete against the Mustang, but it also sold poorly by comparison. The Monza performed well for a sporty car, even as a sports car, but lacked a V8 engine and its reputation was tarnished by Ralph Nader in his book, Unsafe at Any Speed. It took GM until the 1967 model year to counter with the Chevrolet Camaro and Pontiac Firebird. Lincoln-Mercury joined the competition in 1966 with the Mercury Cougar, an "upmarket Mustang" and subsequent Motor Trend Car of the Year. In mid-year 1967, American Motors (AMC) introduced the Javelin, an image-changing "standout," for the 1968 model year. For the 1970 model year the Dodge Challenger, a version of the Plymouth Barracuda platform, was last to join the pony car race.

See also 
 Ford Mustang
 Ford Mustang Mach 1
 Shelby Mustang

References

External links 

Mustang 1st
Muscle cars
Coupés
Convertibles
Rear-wheel-drive vehicles
Cars introduced in 1964
1970s cars